Degu Debebe (born 19 March 1982) is an Ethiopian footballer. He currently plays for Dicha SC.

Career
Degu is a defender and is part of the Ethiopia national football team. He began his career with Arba Minch City FC. In the summer of 2004, he joined Saint-George SA. He was voted player of the 04/05 season and received 1,000 birr prize money. Since his arriving, Degu is a model of consistency, rarely making errors and has helped the club win 6 Premier League titles.

International career

Degu debuted for Ethiopia in 2003. With 46 caps he is one of the most capped players in Ethiopian history. He is also the captain of the team.

References

External links
 
 

1984 births
Living people
Ethiopian footballers
Ethiopia international footballers
2013 Africa Cup of Nations players
Ethiopia A' international footballers
2014 African Nations Championship players
Sportspeople from Southern Nations, Nationalities, and Peoples' Region
Association football central defenders
Saint George S.C. players
Arba Minch City F.C. players